Michel Cullin (17 September 1944 – 3 March 2020) was "Maître de conférences“ at the University of Nice and director of French-Austrian relations at the Diplomatic Academy of Vienna.

Life 
Cullin was born in Paris. After he earned his degrees in political science and German studies (1962–65) in Paris, Michel Cullin became "Assistant de français“ at the "Theresianum-school" in Vienna (1966–1967). Between 1967-69 he was "Lecteur de français“ at the University of Vienna. After working at the Geschwister-Scholl-Institute and the Ludwig Maximilian University of Munich (1969–71) he became "Assistant d’allemand“ (1971–76), "Maître- assistant de civilisation autrichienne“ (1976–80) and later "Maître de conférences de civilisation autrichienne“ (1980–82) at the University of Orléans.

In 1977 he earned a doctoral degree in "études allemandes contemporaines“ (1977). Furthermore, he worked as French correspondent for the ORF and was director of the "club franco-allemand“ of Orléans. Between 1979-82, he was researching on behalf of the "Deutsch-Französischen Jugendwerks“ and two years later he joined the aid association of CEMEA. The following years, Cullin lived in Vienna and was director of the French institute (1982–1986) and guest professor at the University. He worked for several newspapers. He worked at the Universities of Heidelberg, Leipzig and Jena and was between 1991-95 Cultural attaché for cooperation in higher education at the French embassy in Berlin. Between 1998-99 he was "Maître de conférences" at the University of Nice.
He was actively involved  in politics.

Cullin was awarded the Austrian Cross of Honour for Science and Art in 1978. From 2008 onward, he represented France in the International Council of the Austrian Service Abroad with Beate Klarsfeld and supported especially the work of young Austrians in Holocaust Memorial Centers and Jewish museums worldwide. He died in Vienna.

References

French political scientists
Germanists
Diplomats from Paris
1944 births
2020 deaths
Recipients of the Austrian Cross of Honour for Science and Art
French male non-fiction writers